Poole County is one of the 141 Cadastral divisions of New South Wales. It is located in the extreme north-west of the state, abutting Cameron Corner. It includes parts of Sturt National Park.

Poole County was named in honour of James Poole (explorer), (born?-1845), Charles Sturt's second-in-command.

Parishes within this county
A full list of parishes found within this county; their current LGA and mapping coordinates to the approximate centre of each location is as follows:

References

Counties of New South Wales